Julie Wyman is an American director, cinematographer, and professor whose work is concerned with body image. She mainly makes documentary film and currently teaches at UC Davis as an associate professor of Cinema and Digital Media.

Early life and education
Julie Wyman received a BA in Anthropology and English from Amherst College in 1993. She completed a MFA in Visual Studies at UC San Diego in 2002.

Career
A Boy Named Sue documents the transition of a FTM person named Theo. The film delves into the physical and emotional effects of medical transitioning as well as the changes in the way Theo interacted with the world and the world interacted with him. It won the Sappho award for Best Documentary in 2000 and was nominated for the Gay and Lesbian Alliance Against Defamation's Best Documentary Media Award.

In 2012 she completed and began showing her full-length documentary Strong! about three time Olympic competitor Cheryl Haworth. Strong! began filming in 2004 and was originally planned to be a short film. Strong! aired on PBS's Independent Lens series in 2012.

Honors
Wyman's film A Boy Named Sue won the Sappho award for Best Documentary in 2000 and was nominated for the Gay and Lesbian Alliance Against Defamation's Best Documentary Media Award in the same year but did not win.

In 2012, Wyman won the Princess Grace Award for Film Honorarium.

Filmography

See also 
 Body positivity
 Feminist art
 Women's cinema
 List of LGBT-related films directed by women

References

External links
 Julie Wyman Bibliography, ucdavis.edu 
 

Year of birth missing (living people)
Living people
American film directors